Sandin is a surname of Swedish origin. Sandín also refers to the surname found in Spain and Latin America, particularly (Brazil, Mexico, Argentina and Uruguay). The distribution of Spanish births, are most common in Zamora with (33,73%) of people with the surname and it being their first Surname, Madrid (14,45%), Cáceres (9,99%) and Salamanca (8,23%).

Sandin

Frequency and distribution
Most prevalent in Sweden – 3,399 people.
Highest density in Sweden – (frequency 1:2,897) 278th most common surname.

Sandín

Frequency and distribution
Most prevalent in Spain – 22 people.
Highest density in Uruguay – 35,955th most common surname.

People
Åke Sandin, Swedish sprint canoer who competed in the late 1960s and early 1970s 
Daniel J. Sandin, American video and computer graphics artist/researcher. 
Elis Sandin  (1901–1987), Swedish cross country skier who competed in the 1924 Winter Olympics  
Emil Sandin, professional Swedish ice hockey player 
Erik Sandin,  American drummer of the California punk band, NOFX  
Lennart Sandin  (1919–1991), Swedish bobsledder who competed in the early 1950s
Max Sandin (1889?–1967)), American anti-war activist
Ramon Sandin, also known as Guy Sandin, (1970) was a Puerto Rican Olympic diver is now an actor.
Rasmus Sandin, Swedish ice hockey player 
Sandin Wilson, American  bassist and vocalist from the Pacific Northwest

References

Surnames of Swedish origin